Argemone is a genus of flowering plants in the family Papaveraceae commonly known as prickly poppies. There are about 32 species native to the Americas and Hawaii. The generic name originated as ἀργεμώνη in Greek and was applied by Dioscorides to a poppy-like plant used to treat cataracts.

Selected species

Formerly placed here
Papaver armeniacum (L.) DC. (as A. armeniaca L.)

References

External links
Jepson Manual Treatment

Further reading

 
Papaveraceae genera